The 104th Brigade was a unit of the Croatian Army that existed during the Croatian War of Independence.

History 

The 104th was formed as part of the Croatian National Guard on May 8, 1991, and officially activated as of July 2, 1991. Operations were undertaken in September 1991 as part of blockades of the Yugoslav People's Army at Varaždin, which remains the home of the brigade.

The brigade undertook front line combat duty against Serbian forces in October 1991 and operated there into December 1992, suffering 174 casualties (29 dead). Operations in 1993 resulted in a further 13 casualties (1 dead). Around 12,000 soldiers served in the brigade from 1991 to 1995.

After demobilization, the brigade became a recruit training unit.

Operations 

 Siege of Varaždin Barracks, September 1991
 Kalnik partisan barracks blockade, September 1991
 Bjelovar barracks blockade, 1991
 Nuštar, Slavonia front-line duty, October, 1991
 Lipik-Pakrac front-line duty, November 1991 - July 1992
 Posavina front-line duty, to July 1993
 Operation Flash, 1995
 Operation Storm, 1995

People 

 Major Mirko Druško, 2nd Battalion Commander
 Colonel Ivan Matoković, Brigade Commander from 1994
 Major Vjeran Rožić, Brigade Commander 1993 to 1994
 Colonel Ivan Rukljić, Brigade Commander to December 15, 1992

See also 
 List of military equipment of Croatia

References

Sources
 104th Brigade of Croatian army, Varazdin

Brigades of Croatia
Military units and formations established in 1991
1991 establishments in Croatia
History of Varaždin